En El Idioma del Amor (Eng.: In the Language of Love') is the title of a studio album released by romantic music ensemble Grupo Bryndis. This album became their second number-one hit on the Billboard Top Latin Albums chart.

Track listing
This information from Billboard.com
Vas a Sufrir (Mauro Posadas) — 3:46
Un Brindis Por Tí (Juan Guevara) — 3:51
Te Amo, Te Extraño (Mauro Posadas) — 3:56
Se Marchó (Guadalupe Guevara) — 3:19
Felicidad (Juan Guevara) — 3:45
La Pregunta (Mauro Posadas) — 4:04
El Idioma del Amor (Juan Guevara) — 3:58
Yo Te Amaré (Claudio Pablo Montaño) — 3:38
Mañana Partiré (Guadalupe Guevara) — 3:37
Quisiera Olvidarte (Gerardo Izaguirre) — 3:29

Chart performance

References

2001 albums
Grupo Bryndis albums
Disa Records albums